USS Philadelphia, a 1240-ton, 36-gun sailing frigate, was the second vessel of the United States Navy to be named for the city of Philadelphia. Originally named City of Philadelphia, she was built in 1798–1799 for the United States government by residents of that city. Funding for her construction was raised by a drive that collected $100,000 in one week, in June 1798. She was designed by Josiah Fox and built by Samuel Humphreys, Nathaniel Hutton and John Delavue. Her carved work was done by William Rush of Philadelphia.  She was laid down about November 14, 1798, launched on November 28, 1799, and commissioned on April 5, 1800, with Captain Stephen Decatur, Sr. in command. She was captured by Barbary pirates in Tripoli with William Bainbridge in command. Stephen Decatur led a raid that burned her down, preventing her use by the pirates.

Service history

USS Philadelphia put to sea for duty in the West Indies, where the United States was involved in the Quasi-War with France. She arrived on the Guadeloupe Station in May 1800 and relieved the frigate . During this cruise she captured five French armed vessels and recaptured six merchant ships that had been taken by French ships.

Returning home in March 1801, she was ordered to prepare for a year's cruise in the Mediterranean in a squadron commanded by Commodore Richard Dale. At his own request, Decatur was relieved of the command of Philadelphia by Captain Samuel Barron. The squadron arrived at Gibraltar on July 1, with Commodore Dale in the frigate . Philadelphia was directed to cruise the Straits and blockade the coast of Tripoli, since in May 1801 the Pasha Yusuf Karamanli had threatened to wage war on the United States and had seized U.S. merchant vessels for ransom.

Philadelphia departed Gibraltar for the United States in April 1802, arriving in mid-July. In ordinary until May 21, 1803, she recommissioned (having her sixteen 9-pounder long guns replaced with sixteen 32-pounder carronades at this time), and sailed for the Mediterranean on July 28, 1803. She arrived in Gibraltar on August 24 with Captain William Bainbridge in command. Two days later he recaptured the American brig Celia from the Moroccan ship-of-war Mirboka (24 guns and 100 men), and brought them both into Gibraltar.

Capture

The captain, William Bainbridge, tried to refloat the ship, first laying the sails aback, and casting off three bow anchors and shifting the guns aftward, but a strong wind and rising waves drove her further aground.

He ordered the crew to jettison many of the cannons, barrels of water, and other heavy articles overboard in order to lighten the ship, but this too failed. They sawed off the foremast in one last desperate attempt to lighten it. In order not to resupply the Tripoli pirates, Captain Bainbridge ordered holes drilled in the ship's bottom, gunpowder dampened, sails set afire, and all other weapons thrown overboard before he surrendered.  The Pasha's officials enslaved the American officers and men as war captives.

Burning

The Tripoli pirates had finally managed to refloat Philadelphia. Americans believed that the warship was too great a prize to be allowed to remain in foreign hands, so the Navy decided to recapture or destroy it.

Lieutenant Stephen Decatur, son of USS Philadelphia's first captain, led a party of 83 volunteers to carry out this task. On February 16, 1804, under the cover of night and in the guise of a ship in distress that had lost all anchors in a storm and needed a place to tie up, Decatur sailed Intrepid next to Philadelphia. The Americans boarded the prize and, after making sure that she was not seaworthy, burned the ship where she lay in Tripoli Harbor. Decatur's force suffered only one wounded member and killed at least 20 Tripolitans.

Britain's Viscount Nelson is said to have called this feat "the most bold and daring act of the Age". The authenticity of this quote remains in doubt.

The crewmen captured in 1803 were released pursuant to the 1805 Treaty of Tripoli, which ended the war. Philadelphia's anchor was returned to the United States on April 7, 1871, when Mehmed Halet Pasha, the Ottoman governor, presented it to the captain of the visiting .

Local account of the destruction

In 1904, Charles Wellington Furlong, an American adventurer, went to Tripoli to investigate the sinking of Philadelphia. He later wrote about the history in his book, The Gateway to the Sahara: Observations and Experiences in Tripoli (1909).

Based on records from a local synagogue, Furlong wrote:

Furlong later reported in the same book that other Arabs in Tripoli had said that the ship was not burned, but moved to the Lazaretto. There it was decorated as a trophy and its guns were fired to mark the end of Ramadan, the major Muslim holiday. According to the detailed account of Hadji-Mohammed Gabroom, an American ketch sneaked into the harbor, its crew killed some of the 10 guards, and allowed the others to flee. It set Philadelphia on fire.

Popular culture

The burning of the USS Philadelphia appears in the US DLC of the RTS game Age of Empires III: Definitive Edition.

See also
List of sailing frigates of the United States Navy
List of ships captured in the 19th century
Bibliography of early American naval history

References

Bibliography
 Url
 Chapelle, Howard I. (1935) The American Sailing Navy, W. W. Norton and Co., New York, p. 400.
 Url
 Url
 Kilmeade, Brian & Yaeger, Don (2015) Thomas Jefferson and the Tripoli Pirates: The Forgotten War That Changed American History. Sentinel., New York, .

 Url

Further reading
 London, Joshua E. (2011) Victory in Tripoli: How America's War with the Barbary Pirates Established the U.S. Navy and Shaped a Nation, John Wiley & Sons, Inc., New Jersey, p. 288, Book
 Oren, Michael B. (2007) Power, Faith, and Fantasy, Chapter 3, W. W. Norton and Co., New York, .
 Willis, Sam (2007). Fighting Ships: 1750–1850, Quercus Books, London.
 Zachs, Richard (2005). The Pirate Coast: Thomas Jefferson, the First Marines, and the Secret Mission of 1805, Hyperion, New York.

External links

A Journal kept on board the United States Frigate Philadelphia, 1800-1801, MS 170 held by Special Collections & Archives, Nimitz Library at the United States Naval Academy

 

Barbary Wars American ships
Captured ships
History of Tripoli, Libya
Maritime incidents in 1804
Quasi-War ships of the United States
Sailing frigates of the United States Navy
Ships built in Philadelphia
Shipwrecks in the Mediterranean Sea
Vessels captured from the United States Navy
1799 ships
Ship fires